The Impostors is a 1998 American farce motion picture directed, written and produced by Stanley Tucci, starring Oliver Platt, Tucci, Alfred Molina, Tony Shalhoub, Steve Buscemi, and Billy Connolly.

The film, in which Oliver Platt and Stanley Tucci play a Laurel and Hardy-like odd couple of out-of work actors, is set in the depression-era 1930s; indeed, the retro style of the film is a re-creation of 1930s screwball comedy.  The opening silent sequence harks back to the golden days of silent film.

The film was screened in the Un Certain Regard section at the 1998 Cannes Film Festival.

Plot 
In New York City in 1938 Arthur and Maurice scrape together a living on petty swindles, practicing their acting technique whenever they can. Following a drunken confrontation with pretentious and dreadful Shakespearean actor Sir Jeremy Burtom, they are forced to hide as stowaways on an ocean liner.

Unfortunately for the duo, Burtom himself turns out to be a passenger on the ship, along with a vividly diverse ensemble of larger-than-life characters: a suicidal crooner named Happy Franks sobs through a song; Mr. Sparks, an aging gay professional tennis player; the first mate Voltri, who is also a mad bomber with his own language; and many more.

Mistaken identities, pratfalls, slapstick, outrageous dialogue, and general mayhem ensue.

Cast

Production 
Stanley Tucci and producer Elizabeth W. Alexander pitched the film to studios but were initially unable to persuade one to support the initial budget of $12 million. Eventually, Fox Searchlight was able to finance the film at $8 million.

The genesis of the principal characters in "The Impostors" began earlier, when Tucci and Oliver Platt were acting at Yale along with Tony Shalhoub. Subsequently, Tucci and Platt teamed up as a pair of dognappers in the 1992 movie Beethoven. Based on their experiences acting together, Tucci developed "The Impostors" for himself and Platt to capitalize on their physical appearance, although Tucci did not "think of us as the next Laurel and Hardy, even though we are shaped and named just like Stan and Ollie." The script for "The Impostors" was completed in late 1996, and the movie went into production by the middle of 1997.

On-location filming took place in New York and New Jersey, with other filming taking place at an ocean liner set built for the movie at Silvercup Studios in Queens.  Filming was completed late in 1997.

Reception
The Impostors holds a 63% approval rating on Rotten Tomatoes based on 38 reviews, with an average rating of 6.4/10. The consensus states: "The Impostors might have benefited from a more consistently witty script, but writer-director Stanley Tucci acquits himself nicely as an orchestrator of screwball comedy in this uneven debut."

In 2021, Tucci said that when anyone tells him that The Impostors is their favorite movie, he "accuse[s] them of having escaped from an asylum," and that if someone else had directed it, "then I think it would have been a really good movie."

References

External links 
 

1998 films
1998 comedy films
1990s English-language films
1990s American films
American screwball comedy films
1990s screwball comedy films
1990s buddy comedy films
Fictional duos
Fox Searchlight Pictures films
Films directed by Stanley Tucci
Films shot in New Jersey
Films set in the 1930s
Films set on ships